XHZQ-FM is a radio station on 93.7 FM in Cunduacán, Tabasco, Mexico, known as ZQ.

History
XEZQ-AM 1520 received its concession on October 28, 1970. It was owned by Carlos Zerecero Díaz and broadcast from Huimanguillo with 1,000 watts day and 100 night. By 1993, XEZQ was on 820 kHz with 3,000 watts day and 250 watts night. Not long after, it moved to 830 with 5,000 watts day and 1,000 at night. The current concessionaires are Zerecero Díaz's heirs.

XEZQ migrated to FM in 2010.

References

Radio stations in Tabasco